Goleta is a genus of Malagasy jumping spiders that was first described by George and Elizabeth Peckham in 1894.  it contains only two species, found only on Madagascar: G. peckhami and G. workmani.

References

Salticidae genera
Salticidae
Spiders of Madagascar